Adarsh Kumar Goel (born 7 July 1953) is an Indian Judge. Presently, he is Chairperson of National Green Tribunal. He is former Judge of Supreme Court of India. He is also former Chief Justice of the Orissa High Court and  Gauhati High Court, and a former Judge of Gauhati High Court and Punjab and Haryana High Court.

Career 

Justice Adarsh Kumar Goel did his B.A. (Hons.) and LL.B. from Panjab University. He was enrolled as an Advocate with the Bar Council of Punjab and Haryana on 16 July 1974. He practised before the High Court of Punjab and Haryana for about five years and before the Supreme Court of India and Delhi High Court for about 22 years. He was designated as Senior Advocate by the Supreme Court on 11 February 1999. He was elevated as Judge of the Punjab and Haryana High Court on 2 July 2001. Justice Goel was appointed Executive Chairman, Haryana State Legal Services Authority on 17 May 2005. He was the Chief Justice (Acting) of the Punjab and Haryana High Court from 2 May 2011 till he joined as the Senior most Judge of the Gauhati High Court on 12 September 2011. Thereafter, he was sworn in as Chief Justice of the Gauhati High Court on 20 December 2011. He was then sworn in as Chief Justice of the Odisha High Court on 12 October 2013. Justice Goel was elevated as Judge of Supreme Court and assumed charge on 7 July 2014. Thereafter, he was appointed the Chairperson of the National Green Tribunal, New Delhi.

Notable Judgments 
In Pradyuman Bisht vs. Union of India & Ors. case of installation of CCTV cameras in Courts, Tribunals, the Bench headed by Justice Goel and Justice Lalit held that by installation of CCTV cameras the objective of transparent judicial system can be achieved.

Justice Goel initiated the idea of usage of technology in matrimonial dispute. In Krishna Veni Nigam vs. Harish Nigam, the Bench was of the opinion that, “tools like video conferencing should be used in matrimonial cases where the place of adjudication is not convenient to either of the parties.” The Bench further said that, "it may be appropriate that available technology of video conferencing is used where both the parties have equal difficulty and there is no place which is convenient to both the parties."

Justice Goel’s judgment on prevention of misuse of SC/ST Act in Dr. Shubhash Kashinath Mahajan vs. The State of Maharashtra, is one of the much talked about decisions. Justice Goel along with Justice Lalit examined the question on the inclusion of procedural safeguards so that the provisions of Scheduled Castes and the Scheduled Tribes (Prevention of Atrocities) (SC/ST) Act 1989 are not abused for extraneous considerations. The Bench held that, a Government official cannot be prosecuted on mere allegation of committing an offence under the Act without the sanction of appointing authority.

Thereafter, to cut down the backlog of cases, Justice Goel had given a specific deadline for dealing with cases of bail application and two years time for disposing of cases dealing with serious crime. The Bench in Krishnakant Tamrakar vs. The State of M.P.  asked “all high courts to issue directions to subordinate courts that all bail applications should normally be disposed of by judicial officers within one week. Magisterial trials, where accused are in custody, be normally concluded within six months and sessions trials where accused are in custody be normally concluded within two years.

Justice Goel  in the judgment in Rajesh Sharma & Ors. vs. State of U.P. & Anr., also set forth new guidelines to prevent misuse of S.498A of IPC. While giving the guidelines, he observed that, “It is a matter of serious concern that large number of cases continues to be filed under Section 498A alleging harassment of married women. To remedy the situation, we are of the view that involvement of civil society in the aid of administration of justice can be one of the steps, apart from the investigating officers and the concerned trial courts being sensitized. It is also necessary to facilitate closure of proceedings where a genuine settlement has been reached instead of parties being required to move High Court only for that purpose”.

With a view to achieve a progressive step, Justice Goel in his judgment in Amardeep Singh vs. Harveen Kaur, held that, “the 6 months waiting period prescribed under Section 13B(2) of Hindu Marriage Act for divorce by mutual consent is not mandatory, and can be waived under certain circumstances.

Further, in B. Sunitha vs. The State of State of Telangana he also gave his opinion and asked the government to take cognizance on the issue of introducing requisite legislative changes for a regulatory mechanism to check violation of professional ethics by Lawyers.

Justice Goel as Chairperson of National Green Tribunal 

Justice A. K. Goel was appointed the Chairperson of the National Green Tribunal on 6 July 2018. Initially when he was appointed there were huge backlogs of cases that were pending not only with the Principal Bench but also with other Zonal Benches. Since his appointment, Justice Goel has made all Benches functional by hearing matters through Video Conferencing from Bhopal, Chennai, Kolkata and Pune Bench.

References

https://www.news18.com/news/india/meet-the-two-judges-who-are-set-to-create-history-in-supreme-court-1619991.html
http://www.greentribunal.gov.in/COURT1_ORDER.aspx

1953 births
Living people
Chief Justices of the Gauhati High Court
Chief Justices of the Orissa High Court
Justices of the Supreme Court of India
Panjab University alumni
20th-century Indian judges
21st-century Indian judges